Rudolf Wurmbrandt (born 20 September 1922; date of death unknown) was an Austrian ice hockey player. He competed in the men's tournament at the 1948 Winter Olympics.

References

External links
 

1922 births
Year of death missing
20th-century Austrian people
Austrian ice hockey players
Ice hockey players at the 1948 Winter Olympics
Olympic ice hockey players of Austria
Place of birth missing